John Fritsche Jr. (born September 3, 1991) is a Swiss-American professional ice hockey forward who is currently a free agent. He last played for Genève-Servette HC of the National League (NL).

Personal life
His father, John Fritsche Sr., was a longtime player in Switzerland for HC Ambri-Piotta, HC Lugano and EV Zug, played for the United States at the 1990 World Hockey Championship, and coached the Ohio Junior Blue Jackets.

References

External links

1991 births
American men's ice hockey forwards
Ice hockey players from Ohio
John. Jr.
Living people
People from Parma, Ohio
SC Bern players
Sportspeople from Cuyahoga County, Ohio
People from Bellinzona
Sportspeople from Ticino